WJCI is an FM radio station located in Fort Wayne, Indiana. The station operates on the FM radio frequency of 102.9 MHz. It broadcasts a Christian radio format and is an affiliate of Calvary Radio Network.

History
The station signed on as WEXI on September 1, 1965, originally at 103.1 FM, and licensed to nearby Roanoke.

Ed Hughes was the owner/manager of WHUZ from 1979 to 1984, as it operated as a Top 40 station. The station was purchased by Price Communications in 1985, and renamed WIOE-FM "Commercial Free 103," targeting teen listeners in Fort Wayne. After nearly a year of commercial-free operation, the station eventually began running commercials. The station flipped to a simulcast with sister station WOWO in 1988, still on 103.1 and renamed WOWO-FM. Eventually, the frequency was changed to 102.9 FM and the station adopted the call letters WXKE, which had been used for many years on a rock/classic rock format at 103.9 FM. In February 2004, WXKE dropped its simulcast with sister WXTW and changed formats to Standards as "The River."

WXKE was purchased, along with its sister stations by the Summit City Radio Group in July 2004. The standards "River" format drifted over to sister WGL 1250 AM and WXKE relaunched as Classic Hits "Mike-FM." In 2006, the station abandoned its Classic Hits format and flipped formats to a simulcast of sister WGL AM under the call sign WWGL. Within a few months, call letters were changed again to WGL-FM, with the city of license Huntington, Indiana.

On April 1, 2010, WGL-FM changed their format from adult standards (simulcasting WGL 1250 AM) to Hot Adult Contemporary, branded as "V102.9". WGL (AM) continued broadcasting the "River" standards format as "1250 The River." The simulcast with the AM station returned on June 3, 2013, when both WGL-FM and WGL switched to an oldies format, including a morning show hosted by former WLYV and WQHK-FM disc jockey Rick Hughes, as well as an afternoon show with Pat White carried over from WGL AM's standards format. As part of the change, Delilah was dropped from the WGL-FM lineup.

On June 3, 2013, at 6AM, after playing Fun's Some Nights WGL-FM abruptly changed their format from hot adult contemporary to oldies, branded as "Oldies 102.9".

In March 2014, Adams Radio Group entered an agreement to purchase Summit City's cluster (which includes WGL AM and FM). Days later, Adams announced they would purchase Oasis Radio Group's stations. To meet ownership limits, Adams will retain WNHT, WGL and WXKE, as well as acquiring Oasis Radio Group's WJFX and WBTU, while selling off WHPP to Fort Wayne Catholic Radio, and selling WGL-FM to Calvary Radio Network. WGL-FM dropped the oldies format for Christian programming on June 2, 2014. The last song on Oldies 102.9 was American Pie by Don McLean. On June 11, 2014, 102.9 changed its callsign to the current WJCI. The first song on The Calvary Radio Network was Peace In The Valley by Elvis Presley, introduced by Taylor Swift, who said that Presley is her favorite singer of all time.

References

External links
Calvary Radio's official website

JCI
JCI
Radio stations established in 1965